Audeoudia is a genus of snout moths. It was described by Joseph de Joannis in 1927 and is known from Mozambique and Tanzania.

Species
 Audeoudia grisella de Joannis, 1927
 Audeoudia haltica Meyrick, 1933

References

Phycitinae
Moth genera